HMS Versatile (D32) was an Admiralty V-class destroyer of the British Royal Navy that saw service in World War I, the Russian Civil War, and World War II.

Construction and commissioning
Versatile, the first Royal Navy ship of the name, was ordered on 30 June 1916 as part of the 9th Order of the 1916–17 Naval Programme. She was laid down on 31 January 1917 by Hawthorn Leslie and Company at Tyneside, England, and launched on 31 October 1917. She was completed on 11 February 1918 and commissioned into service the same day. Her original pennant number, F29, was later changed to G10 and became D32 during the interwar period.

Service history

World War I
All V- and W-class destroyers, Versatile among them, were assigned to the Grand Fleet or Harwich Force. Versatile saw service in the last year of World War I.

Interwar years
During 1919, Versatile took part in the British campaign against Bolshevik forces in the Baltic Sea during the Russian Civil War. Sailors of the ship took part in the Royal Navy mutiny of 1919. She then served in the 1st Destroyer Flotilla in the Atlantic Fleet.

On 23 March 1922, Versatile was steaming off Europa Point, Gibraltar, at 20 knots with other destroyers while British submarines practised attacks on them. The submarine  surfaced unexpectedly only 30 or 120 yards (27 or 110 meters) – sources differ – ahead of her. Versatile went to full speed astern on her engines and put her helm over hard to port, but had not yet begun to answer her helm when she rammed H42 abaft the conning tower, almost slicing the submarine in half. H42 sank with the loss of all hands. An investigation found H42 at fault for surfacing where she did against instructions.

In 1931, Versatile  joined her flotilla in a three-week cruise to various ports on the Baltic Sea. In October 1936, she was decommissioned, transferred to the Reserve Fleet, and placed in reserve at the Nore.

With tensions between the United Kingdom and Nazi Germany rising, the Royal Navy recommissioned Versatile in 1939.

World War II

1939–1940
When the United Kingdom entered World War II in September 1939, Versatile deployed with the 11th Destroyer Flotilla for convoy defence duty in the Southwestern Approaches and North Atlantic Ocean, based at Plymouth. She and the destroyer  escorted Convoy OB 1 on 8 September 1939, and on 15 September 1939 she, Vimy, and the destroyer  escorted Convoy OB 5; both convoys were carrying troops and equipment of the British Expeditionary Force from the United Kingdom to France. From 12 to 15 February 1940, Versatile joined Enchantress, the sloop , the minesweeper , and the submarine  as the escort for Convoy HG 18F during the final leg of its voyage from Gibraltar to Liverpool.

In May 1940 – the month in which her pennant number was changed to I32 – Versatile was detached from convoy duty after escorting Convoy OB 144 and, after refuelling at Plymouth, was assigned to operations related to the evacuation of Allied personnel from the Netherlands, Belgium, and France in the face of the successful German offensive there. On 12 May 1940 she ran aground on the Dutch coast but was towed off by the destroyer . Early on 13 May 1940, Versatile arrived off the Hook of Holland to take part in Operation Ordnance, the evacuation of Allied personnel from that port. That evening, she was underway in the North Sea as an escort for the destroyer , upon which Queen Wilhelmina of the Netherlands was embarked for passage to Breskens, when German aircraft attacked at 20:45 hours. One bomb struck Versatiles upper deck, causing her engine room to flood, and splinters from that bomb and several near misses killed nine men, fatally injured another, wounded a third of her crew, and damaged her steam pipe, causing her to go dead in the water. The destroyer  towed her to Sheerness, England, for repairs.

After completing repairs in June 1940, Versatile was assigned to the 21st Destroyer Flotilla at Sheerness and began convoy duty in the English Channel and Southwestern Approaches.

In July 1940, Versatiles duties expanded to include anti-invasion patrols as the threat of a German invasion of the United Kingdom grew. She came under air attack again on 3 July, avoiding damage, and again escaped damage on 10 July when German aircraft attacked a convoy she was escorting in the English Channel off Dungeness, although one ship of the convoy was sunk. She had frequent encounters with German aircraft through August 1940.

On 25 August 1940, Versatile and Vimy were transferred to the Home Fleet at Scapa Flow in the Orkney Islands and on 31 August 1940 were ordered to raise steam to intercept a German naval force reported to have shelled Eastbourne on Englands east coast. In early September Versatile escorted Convy BAS 31 from the River Clyde to Iceland and received orders en route to alter course to avoid a reported German invasion force bound for Iceland. On 30 September, she cooperated with a Royal Air Force Avro Anson aircraft in a search for a German submarine after the merchant ship Fort George reported sighting a periscope.

From 3 to 5 October 1940, Versatile was part of the escort of Convoy WS 3A Slow during the portion of its voyage that took place in the Southwestern Approaches, joining the destroyer  in screening the passenger liner Highland Brigade. During this activity, her Asdic and degaussing coil both failed, and the following day she began to experience serious oil leaks into her living spaces. After undergoing temporary repairs at Derry (also called Londonderry) in Northern Ireland, on 10 October 1940, she proceeded to the River Tyne for a refit and repairs.

1941–1942
Upon completion of her refit, Versatile returned to escort duty in the Southwestern Approaches. Almost all the convoys she escorted came under German air attack. On 27 January 1941, her steering gear failed in the English Channel while she was operating near merchant ships in rough waters and with little manoeuvring room, but she managed to avoid a collision with the ships she was escorting.

In February 1941, Versatile was transferred to Harwich for convoy defence duty in the North Sea. She was in action along with the destroyer  and corvette  with German motor torpedo boats – S-boats, known to the Allies as "E-boats" – in the North Sea off Lowestoft on 6 March 1941 while escorting Convoy FN 26. On 13 March 1941, she attacked a submarine contact. She reported on 14 March 1941 that the merchant ship Hereport had struck a mine and sunk, and she rescued 11 survivors and took them to Sheerness; that evening, a German S boat attacked her unsuccessfully. She reported on 16 March that the merchant ship Mexico had struck a mine and sunk, and on 26 March she shot down a German Messerschmitt Bf 110 that attacked a convoy she was escorting in the North Sea.

For the rest of 1941 and throughout 1942, Versatile escorted convoys in the North Sea, defending them against frequent German air attacks. She was "adopted" by the civil community of Tipton in Staffordshire in a Warship Week fundraising campaign in February 1942.

1943–1945
Near the end of 1942, the Royal Navy selected Versatile for conversion into a long-range escort, and in January 1943 she left her North Sea duties and entered the shipyard of the Grangemouth Dockyard Company at Grangemouth, Scotland, for conversion. After its completion and passing her post-conversion sea trials, Versatile was assigned to the 7th Escort Group in September 1943 and began convoy escort duty in the Western Approaches. She continued in this role until April 1944, when she was selected for service in Force J in support of the upcoming Allied invasion of Normandy, scheduled for early June 1944. In May 1944 she took part in exercises with Force J in the English Channel to prepare for the invasion.

In early June 1944, Versatile deployed in The Solent with Force J to escort convoys to the invasion beaches, and she and a Royal Navy Coastal Forces motor launch joined Convoy J 14 – consisting of the infantry landing ship , 12 infantry landing craft, 24 tank landing craft, two antiaircraft landing craft, one rocket tank landing craft, and one United States Coast Guard vessel – as its escort on 4 June 1944. The invasion was postponed from 5 to 6 June due to bad weather, but on 5 June Convoy J 14 began its voyage to Juno Beach, arriving at its launch point on 6 June 1944 half an hour before the landings. On 7 June, Versatile embarked Rear Admiral William G. Tennant, who was in command of the Mulberry harbour operation and of the undersea pipeline effort known as Operation Pluto, to witness the sinking of blockships off Sword Beach to form a Mulberry harbour. On 8 June 1944, she arrived at Portland to begin the daily escort of the EPL 2 series of tank landing ship convoys between the United Kingdom and the invasion beaches.

Released from operations related to the invasion in July 1944, Versatile returned to convoy defence and patrol duties, conducting them in the English Channel and Southwestern Approaches until the surrender of Germany in early May 1945.

Decommissioning and disposal
Versatile was decommissioned soon after Germanys surrender, no longer being carried on the Royal Navys active list by July 1945. By 1947 she was on the disposal list, and she was sold on 7 May 1947 for scrapping by M. Brechin at Granton, Scotland. She arrived at the shipbreakers yard on 10 September 1948.

Notes

Bibliography

External links
 Naval History: SHIPS OF THE ROYAL NAVY, 1914–1919 – in ALPHABETICAL ORDER (Part 2 of 2)
 HMS VERSATILE (D 32) –  V & W-class Destroyer
 uboat.net HMS Versatile (D 32)

V and W-class destroyers of the Royal Navy
Ships built on the River Tyne
1917 ships
World War I destroyers of the United Kingdom
World War II destroyers of the United Kingdom
Maritime incidents in 1922